The Chicago Maternity Center Story is a 1976 feature-length documentary film produced by Kartemquin Films. It tells the story of The Chicago Maternity Center as it fights to stay open despite declining funding. The center had been open for 75 years, but was forced to close in light of modern medicine's changing attitude toward home birth and subsequent lack of resources.

The film is structured in two parts. It first follows the story of Scharene Miller, who was one of the last mothers to use the Maternity Center's home birthing services. The backdrop to this personal story is provided in the broader context of the rise of corporate medicine and the current barriers for the poor in accessing quality medical care. The work of the Center's director, Beatrice Tucker, and other staff are highlighted throughout, as are the demonstrations that attempted to keep the work going.

References

External links 
 Kartemquin Films
 

Documentary films about class
1976 documentary films
1976 films
Kartemquin Films films
Documentary films about health care
Documentary films about Chicago
American documentary films
1970s English-language films
1970s American films